Juan José Govea Tenorio (born 27 January 1991) is an Ecuadorian international footballer who plays for Mushuc Runa of the Ecuadorian Serie A as a forward.

Career
Born in Esmeraldas, Govea is a product of Deportivo Cuenca's youth system,; he made his senior professional debut for them in 2008.

He made his international debut for Ecuador in 2011, and participated at the 2011 FIFA U-20 World Cup.

References

External links

1991 births
Living people
Sportspeople from Esmeraldas, Ecuador
Association football midfielders
Ecuadorian footballers
Ecuadorian expatriate footballers
Ecuador international footballers
C.D. Cuenca footballers
C.D. El Nacional footballers
Atlético Morelia players
Atlético Tucumán footballers
Club Atlético Douglas Haig players
S.D. Aucas footballers
C.S.D. Independiente del Valle footballers
Mushuc Runa S.C. footballers
Ecuadorian Serie A players
Liga MX players
Argentine Primera División players
Primera Nacional players
Ecuadorian Serie B players
Ecuadorian expatriate sportspeople in Mexico
Ecuadorian expatriate sportspeople in Argentina
Expatriate footballers in Mexico
Expatriate footballers in Argentina